K-tel Presents Little Richard Live! 20 Super Hits is Little Richard's first album of new material since 1974, and the first album he had recorded since 1973. Recorded at the Jack Clement Studio in Nashville, the album featured remakes of twenty of his Specialty Records tracks. If you count live takes, this was actually the fifth or sixth time that Richard had recorded his classic mid-1950s hits. Despite the album's title, the tracks are studio recordings, not live performances.  These August 1976 sessions and an early 1990s set with Japanese guitarist, Masayoshi Takanakka, are the last times that Penniman would re-record his mid-1950s hits for a studio album before Penniman's death in May 2020. Alternate takes from these sessions are found on a full stereo "Audiophile" album from 1980.

History
Just prior to recording Little Richard Live!, Richard appeared in the film The London Rock and Roll Show and on piano for two tracks on the Bachman–Turner Overdrive album Head On. Richard was approached by Stan Shulman in 1976, and it took some convincing, but Richard finally agreed to the sessions – he had already made his decision to leave rock and roll for the second time. After recording this album for K-Tel, Penniman did not return to a recording studio until 1979, where he recorded gospel music for the World label.

Penniman reflected on this during an interview for UK music show The Tube in 1985, where he told presenter Jools Holland, "I gave up rock and roll in 1976. I had a lot of death in my family, my brother fell dead, he had a heart attack, he was thirty-two years old. I had another friend who got shot in the head, another friend of mine got cut up with a butcher knife, another friend of mine had a heart attack, then my mother died. Then my nephew shot himself in the head, and so I decided I would just give my life to being an evangelist."

Track listing
(some have been issued as alternate takes)

"The Girl Can't Help It"
"Rip It Up"
"Send Me Some Lovin'"
"Bama Lama Bama Loo"
"She's Got It"
"Can't Believe You Wanna Leave"
"Long Tall Sally"
"Jenny, Jenny"
"Good Golly, Miss Molly"
"Lucille"
"Keep A-Knockin'"
"All Around The World"
"True Fine Mama"
"Ready Teddy"
"By The Light of the Silvery Moon"
"Slippin' and Slidin'"
"Baby Face"
"Ooh! My Soul"
"Miss Ann"
"Tutti Frutti"

Personnel
Little Richard – vocals, piano
Dennis Brownside – piano
Eddie Bayers – drums
Jack Jackson – bass guitar
Paul Worley – guitar
Pat Patnik – guitar
Don Jackson – saxophone

According to K-Tel Records, it is not known whether Richard also played piano on these tracks.

References

Little Richard albums
1976 live albums